Rangapara (IPA: ˈræŋgəˌpɑːrə) is a town and a municipal board in Sonitpur district in the Indian state of Assam.

Geography
It has an average elevation of 206 metres (675 feet).

Demographics
 India census, Rangapara had a population of 18,822. Males constitute 54% of the population and females 46%. Rangapara has an average literacy rate of 76%, higher than the national average of 59.5%: male literacy is 81%, and female literacy is 70%. In Rangapara, 10% of the population is under 6 years of age.

Language

Bengali is the most spoken language at 8,785 speakers, followed by Hindi at 4,043 and Assamese is spoken by 2,583 people.

Transport

The Rangapara North Junction which lies on the Rangiya–Murkongselek section has trains to Kamakhya Junction, New Jalpaiguri Junction, Dekargaon,  Rangiya Junction, New Delhi and Naharlagun.Dibrugarh, Howrah and Tambaram

Politics
Rangapara is part of Tezpur (Lok Sabha constituency). Also an important legislative constituency of the state.

References

Cities and towns in Sonitpur district
Sonitpur district